Dream Maker (Korean: 드림메이커; RR: Deurimmeikeo; MR: Tŭrimmeik'ŏ; also known as Dream Maker: The Search for the Next Global Pop Group) is a Filipino-South Korean boy group survival reality show produced by ABS-CBN Entertainment, MLD Entertainment and KAMP Global, hosted by Ryan Bang and Kim Chiu. The show premiered on A2Z and Kapamilya Channel from November 19, 2022, to February 12, 2023, replacing Hoy Love You 3 and was replaced by I Can See Your Voice on its fifth season. It is also streaming via iWantTFC and Kapamilya Online Live, with international broadcast via MYX Global and TFC. PIE Channel and TV5 aired alongside for the finale.

Dream Maker is the second reality show of ABS-CBN involving boy groups after Pinoy Boyband Superstar in 2016.

Concept
The format is similar to the South Korean survival show franchise Produce 101, where hopefuls will undergo rigorous training to debut as professional talents and performers. 62 Dream Chasers will compete for the top 7 spots, who will be trained and debut in South Korea, and will be launched as a global P-pop group.

Pre-show and marketing
On September 5, 2022, a press conference and contract signing between ABS-CBN, MLD Entertainment, and KAMP Global was held announcing a Filipino idol survival show with auditions happening around the country through Star Hunt. Auditions were open for males aged 13 to 22 who are talented in singing, dancing, or rapping. It was held in multiple Ayala Malls within the month. The head of Star Magic, Laurenti Dyogi earlier stated:

On November 4–6, 2022, the hosts and mentors were first announced on the national news program TV Patrol. A media conference was held three days later. On November 25, the official music video of Dream Maker theme song "Take My Hand" was released on music platforms. The contestants performed the theme song on the noontime variety shows It's Showtime and ASAP Natin 'To.

An interactive program Dream Maker Pause and Play premiered on PIE Channel on January 9, 2023, hosted by DJ Jhai Ho and former MNL48 members Sela Guia and Gabb Skribikin.

Cast
Main hosts
Ryan Bang
Kim Chiu

Korean Dream Mentors
Bae Wan-hee
Seo Won-jin
Bae Yoon-jung
BULL$EYE
Thunder
JeA 

Filipino Dream Mentors
Angeline Quinto 
Darren Espanto
Bailey May
 Maymay Entrata 

Online hosts
VJ Ai dela Cruz
Sela Guia 
Sheena Belarmino

Contestants

The 62 contestants were first announced on the social media accounts of Dream Maker.
Color key

System

Voting
Voting will be online through voting cycles at joinnow.ph or ktx.ph. Voting is free for joinnow.ph but limited to 100 votes per Dream Chaser per device in every voting cycle. Unlimited paid voting for ktx.ph is implemented. The first online voting cycle is from November 19 to December 11, 2022, at 23:00 (PST). The second online voting cycle was held from December 25, 2022, to January 8, 2023, at 23:00 (PST). The third online voting cycle started from January 15 to 29, 2023 at 23:00 (PST). The final voting cycle started from February 5, at 23:00  (PST), and will end on February 12 after the final mission performances.

The voting system changed in the third voting cycle. Votes from joinnow.ph was still implemented, with the same limit of votes, but ktx.ph votes were abolished in this cycle. Votes from dreammaker.ph is implemented in this voting cycle, with 10 votes per account per day. The same rules for the third voting cycle was used in the final voting cycle.

Missions
Dream Mentors' Evaluation (November 19–20, 26–27, 2022)
Dream Chasers will perform individually in front of the Dream Mentors. After each performance, the Dream Mentors will comment and provide feedback on each performance and each Dream Mentor will give points to each of the Dream Chasers. The maximum points possible for a Dream Chaser to earn from each Dream Mentor is 100, for a maximum possible score of 900 points for each contestant. This point system will form the basis of their ranks. If the succeeding Dream Chaser gets a higher rank than the Dream Chaser sitting, he will be bumping off other Dream Chasers based on the order of rank.

Theme Song Mentors' Evaluation (December 3, 2022)
Dream Chasers must memorize the show's theme song and the choreography. The Top 7 Dream Chasers are not guaranteed a center position. On their final assessment, mentors Bae Wan-hee and Angeline Quinto will rank the Dream Chasers by giving each of them letter grades A, B and C. Only 15 Dream Chasers will be on Level A, 20 on Level B, while the rest will be on Level C.

Mission 1 – Group Battle (December 4, 10–11, 2022)
The Dream Chasers are divided into ten groups. Unlike Produce 101, the Dream Mentors chose 10 Dream Chasers whom they think has a leader material. The Dream Mentors chose Wilson Budoy, Vinci Malizon, Jeromy Batac, Drei Amahan, Tatin Castillon, Reyster Yton, KL Socobos, Laurence Matias, Matt Cruz, and Russu Laurente to be the leaders of their respective teams. The leaders will be able to choose their members. Higher-rank members will have priority to choose their members first. After the division, the leaders were divided into two groups (the top five higher-ranking Dream Chaser leaders in one group, while the remaining five in the other group).

Five songs were revealed for the leaders to choose from: Backstreet Boys' "All I Have To Give", NSYNC's "Tearin' Up My Heart", VST & Company's "Awitin Mo, Sasayaw Ko", BINI's "Da Coconut Nut", and BGYO's "He's Into Her". Same with the member selection, higher-ranking leaders will have the priority to choose their song first; however, if more than one chose the same song, there will be a challenge that will be done by the leaders and the one who will accomplish the challenge will get the song they initially chose. Those who lost the challenge will select another song (higher-ranking leaders will have the priority to choose first). Once all the leaders choose their song, they will know their opponent from the other group. 

Each Dream Chaser will be evaluated individually by the Dream Mentors. They can earn a maximum of 800 points from the Dream Mentors (100 points each from the 8 Dream Mentors). The scores of the team members will be added up to determine their team score, and the team who got the highest total points will be the winning group. Each of the members of the winning group will receive 100 points as a bonus for their individual points to be used in the first elimination.

After all the match-up finished, the host Kim Chiu announced that there would only be 44 Dream Chasers left after the first elimination.

Mission 2 – Position Mission (December 31, 2022, January 1, 7–8, 2023)
There will be 8 songs available in this mission: 3 songs for vocals (Zack Tabudlo's "Habang Buhay", Charlie Puth ft. Jungkook's "Left and Right", and Flip Music All Star's "Tuloy Pa Rin"), 3 songs for dance (G22's "Bang", TFN's "Amazon", and Astro's "Alive"), and 2 songs for rap (Francis Magalona's "Kabataan Para sa Kinabukasan" and Juan Caoile ft. Kyleswish's "Marikit"). The vocal groups can have only 5 members, the dance groups will have 7 members, and the rap groups will only have 4 members each. 

To gain an advantage, ten Dream Chasers are chosen via a fishbowl to play an arcade version of basketball. The top 3 Dream Chasers who got the highest points in the arcade will earn an advantage: the priority of choosing the song first and securing their spot on their positions. After that, one by one, the Dream Chasers secretly voted for the song they want to perform. Once a song exceed its limit of Dream Chasers per group, the lower-ranked members will be bumped-off and will need to choose another song. 

Even though the Dream Chasers are grouped by their songs, they are being evaluated by the mentors individually. The Dream chasers can earn a maximum of 700 points from the Dream Mentors (100 points each from the 7 Dream Mentors). Whoever will be ranked first on each groups will earn a 50-point benefit, which will be added from the Dream Mentors' score. Only three Dream Chasers will earn the Best Vocals, Best Dancer, and Best Rapper (the highest-scoring Dream Chaser from each position). Each of these winners will receive an additional 50 points as a bonus for their individual points to be used in the second elimination.

Mission 3 – New K-pop Song Launch Mission (January 21–22, 28–29, 2023)

20 days before the second elimination, Dream Mentor Angeline Quinto revealed the next mission to the remaining 44 Dream Chasers. There will be four songs in this mission: Odd Me, Hit Me, Lovey Dovey, and Tiger, all of which composed by Dream Mentor BULL$EYE. Different from the Produce 101 series, instead of the public choosing the songs appropriate to each of the Dream Chasers, the Dream Chasers themselves will choose the song they wanted to perform. The order of choosing is based on their second ranking.

One by one, starting from rank 1, the Dream Chasers will enter a room with 4 doors, with the songs written on each door. They need to enter the door of the song they wanted to perform. Each door can hold a maximum of 11 members. Once the quota is reached, the door will be locked, and they need to select another song. The Dream Chasers cannot see the selected songs of the Dream Chasers who entered the room first.

However, same with the Produce 101 series, not all Dream Chasers will perform in Mission 3, only those who survived the second elimination will get to perform the song. Different from the series, there will be no rearrangement of the teams, and whoever survived in the last eliminations will be the final group.

Same with the first two missions, each Dream Chaser will be evaluated individually and they can earn a maximum of 600 points (100 points each from the 6 Dream Mentors). Since there are different members in each of the songs, their individual scores will be averaged to get their group score. 

There will be two winning teams in this mission, and these winning teams will have additional benefit. The team who got the second-highest group score will get to perform their song in one Kapamilya show (It's Showtime), while the team who got the highest group score will get to perform their song in two Kapamilya shows (It's Showtime and Magandang Buhay).

Aside from the benefit to perform in Kapamilya shows, the Dream Chaser who got the most votes from the voting booth in the third mall show in Robinsons Las Piñas will get an additional benefit of 30 points, to be used in the third elimination. It was announced in the mall show that Ishiro Incapas will receive the 30-point benefit, garnering 23.22% of the votes, beating Vinci Malizon and Wilson Budoy. 

Mission 4 – Final Mission (February 11–12, 2023)

There will be two original songs in this mission, composed by Dream Mentors BULL$EYE (Dash) and Seo Won-jin (Deja Vu). Dream Chasers are given the chance to pick the song they want to perform. The order of choosing is based on the 3rd elimination ranking. After picking, the groups need to be balanced at 8 members each, and the group with the most members will need to vote secretly via the voting booth and the most voted Dream Chaser(s) will need to pick from another team.

In another twist, the order of the performance is determined by picking a paper in the bowl. Whoever gets the red paper will decide who will perform first. Matt Cruz gets the red paper, and his group decided to perform last.

For the first time, mentors have no bearing in the rank of the Dream Chasers, as the public will select the Top 7 Dream Chasers.

Elimination Mechanics
1st Elimination (December 24–25, 2022)
For the first elimination, the Dream Mentors, as well as the public, will comprise each Dream Chasers' points and rank. 

The scores received by each Dream Chaser from each Dream Mentor during the group battle will be added up, as well as the 100-point benefit for each member of the winning teams will comprise the Dream Mentors' Points. The votes of the people will comprise the Public Points. The highest-voted Dream Chaser will receive 800 points; each rank has a 10-point difference (2nd-voted artist will receive 790, 3rd will receive 780, and so on, until the last place will only get 230 points). The Dream Mentors' points and the Public Points earned by each Dream Chaser will be combined and this will be the basis of their new ranks.

The maximum points that the Dream Chasers can earn is 1,700 points (100 points each from the Dream mentors for a total of 800 points, the 100-point benefit for those Dream Chasers who are member of the winning team, and lastly, 800 points from the public).

Top 44 Dream Chasers will advance to the next mission, while Dream Chasers ranked 45 onwards will be eliminated.

2nd Elimination (January 14–15, 2023)

The same elimination method will be used in this elimination round, except that the highest-voted Dream Chaser will only receive 700 points (as opposed to 800 points in the first elimination). 

The maximum points that the Dream Chasers can earn is 1,500 points (100 points each from the Dream mentors for a total of 700 points, the 100-point benefit for those Dream Chasers who got the Best Vocals, Best Dancer, and Best Rapper, and lastly, 700 points from the public). 

Only 28 Dream Chasers will advance to the next mission, while the remaining Dream Chasers will be eliminated.

3rd Elimination (February 4–5, 2023)

Based on the teaser on Episode 22, only 14 Dream Chasers will advance to the next mission, while the remaining Dream Chasers will be eliminated. However, it was announced on the teaser for Episode 23 that it will be 16 Dream Chasers who will advance to the final.

The same elimination method will be used in this elimination round, except that the highest-voted Dream Chaser will only receive 600 points (as opposed to 700 points in the second elimination). 

However, instead of Dream Chasers being grouped into two groups (Safe Zone and Danger Zone), they will be called one by one (in some circumstances, two or more people will be called) by host Kim Chiu via the large screen in the waiting room to come to the Dream stage. They will not know the fate of the ones called before them until they enter the Dream stage.

4th Elimination (February 12, 2023)

This elimination is different from the other voting cycles, as only the public votes will determine the Final Top 7.

Group Name

The public is given the chance to cast their entries for the group name of the Final 7 Dream Chasers by tweeting the name of the group, as well as the hashtag #MyDreamGroupName and tagging the official Twitter accounts. Entries for the group name started on January 21, 2023, and ended on February 3, 2023. The most creative names will be shortlisted and will be voted by the public via dreammaker.ph from February 6 to 11, at 23:00 (PST). The person with the winning entry will have the chance to watch the finale on February 12, 2023, receive Dream Maker freebies, as well as having the chance to meet the Final Top 7 Dream Chasers.

On Episode 24, the entries are shortlisted into 5 names (B2IN, PR7ME, HORI7ON, DM7, BRIGHT7). On the finale, the group name is revealed to be HORI7ON.

Ranking
For the first ranking, only the Dream mentors determine the Dream Chasers' ranks, in which the first ranking was determined in episode 4. Starting from the first elimination, both the Dream mentors' scores and the public points determine the Dream Chasers' ranks. However, in the last elimination, only the public votes determine the final Dream Chasers’ ranks.

Color key

First voting cycle

Notes
 On episodes 6-8 (Group Battle), an additional 100 points on the mentors' points are given to the boys of the winning teams.
 Although Reyster got more public votes than Ishiro, the broadcast points are 760 and 770 points, respectively.
 The ranking for episode 12 is the result of combining mentors' points from the public points.

Second voting cycle

Notes
 On episodes 13-16 (Position Mission), an additional 50 points on the mentors' points are given to the Dream Chasers who got 1st in their respective groups. An additional 50 points will be given to the Dream Chasers who got 1st in their respective positions.
 The highest-voting Dream Chaser will only get 700 points, instead of 800 in the first elimination.

Third voting cycle

Notes
 It was announced on Episode 19 that there will be two winning teams in this mission (New K-pop Song Launch Mission), with each of them having the chance to perform their mission song in one or two Kapamilya shows. 
 It was announced on Episode 20 that only one will receive a 30-point benefit by having the most votes in the voting booth in the third mall show. In the mall show happened on January 21 (televised on Episode 22), it was announced that Ishiro Incapas will receive the benefit, beating Vinci Malizon and Wilson Budoy.
 The highest-voting Dream Chaser will only get 600 points, instead of 700 in the second elimination.

Final voting cycle

Notes
 Only the public votes will determine the final Top 7, as mentioned by host Kim Chiu on Episode 24.

Episodes

Aftermath

Companion show
The reality television show has a companion show titled Dream Maker: Pause and Play which premiered on January 9, 2023, on PIE Channel.

Notes

References

External links
 

2020s Philippine television series
2022 Philippine television series debuts
2023 Philippine television series endings
ABS-CBN original programming
Filipino-language television shows
Korean-language television shows
K-pop television series
Philippine reality television series
Philippine television series based on South Korean television series
South Korean reality television series
Television shows filmed in the Philippines